Amazarashi (stylized as amazarashi) is a Japanese rock band from Aomori, currently signed to Sony Music Japan. Formed in 2007, its members are Hiromu Akita (lead vocals, guitar, songwriter) and Manami Toyokawa (keyboard). They have released six singles which have all reached the top 20 of the Oricon charts.

Some of the group's most notable songs are "Sora ni Utaeba", the third opening of My Hero Academia, "Speed to Masatsu", the opening theme for the anime Rampo Kitan: Game of Laplace, "Kisetsu wa Tsugitsugi Shindeiku", the ending theme for Tokyo Ghoul √A, "Sayonara Gokko", the first ending theme for the 2019 anime Dororo, and Kyōkaisen, the second opening theme for the 2021 anime Eighty-Six.

Biography

2007–2009: STAR ISSUE and あまざらし era 
2007

 In January 2007, STAR ISSUE was formed. The band's name was inspired by "a desire to transmit songs that have a ray of hope, just like periodic magazines and newspapers."
 On January 26, an event for amateur bands was held in Aomori, called "Glucon Vol. 17: Aomori ~JOKER STYLE SUMMIT~" , all under Roland Corporation. Star Issue was the winner band.

After this point, the band would call themselves amazarashi, written in hiragana as あまざらし. In 2008, the band entered the Rainbow Entertainment Label (a subsidiary of A&R) to promote the band. They let their songs play in the background of local radio programs, in order to get attention from the label and form a contract.

Around the time of debut, Akita was not being very social, and had the intention of displaying a very linguistic world view; he expressed his world view through words without publicly showing his face. The CD jacket was designed around this concept, with poetry enclosed in the package. The promotion around the CD was based on the internet, and the band began real activities.

2009

 On February 18, 2009, the EP  was released exclusively within the Aomori prefecture, marking the band's indie debut.
 On June 24, an album inspired by the movie Kani Kōsen, titled , in which the band was featured with the song .
 On December 9, the band released the EP 0., with only 500 copies of the CD being released in Aomori. At this time, the digital artist YKBX (Masaki Yokobe, also known as Yokoboxxx) became the band's art director, designing the visual mascot for the release. The character, amazarashi-kun, was based on a teru teru bōzu, a spirit believed to bring rain and a good harvest.

2010–2011: From 0.6 to Sennen Kōfukuron 
2010

 On February 10, 2010, the band changed its name from あまざらし to amazarashi, and the album 0. was re-released as 0.6 with a bonus remix of "Hikari, Saikou" as an extra track.
 On April 29, they moved to the Sony Music Associated Records label, the same label as Ling tosite Sigure, and on June 9 the band released the EP  as their major label debut.
 On November 24, they released the EP .

2011

 On January 8, 2011, it was announced that the theme song for the TBS drama show Heaven's Flower The Legend Of Arcana (ヘブンズ・フラワー The Legend of ARCANA) was going to be a song titled  by the band. On March 16 of the same year, the band released the EP of the same title, Anomie.
 On January 18, the band participated on a compilation album, distributed by Crown Tokuma, titled 36.5ºC with the song .
 On June 17, the band performed their first official live, held at Shibuya WWW. According to Akita, in order to transmit the message of the songs properly, they performed behind a screen which images and the song lyrics were projected on to. This was done such in a way such that the crowd wouldn't be able to see their bodies. The band has kept the same performance style since.
 On November 16, the album  was released.

2012: Love Song 

 On January 28 they performed a one-band live at the Shibuya Public Hall.
 On March 11, as a tribute to the victims of the Tohoku Earthquake that happened the previous year, they released the song , based on a poem of the same name which was released by the band immediately after the event, and a site dedicated to the song and event.
 On March 13 the EP  was released.
 On March 16, the band announced that they would go on a tour titled  from June 30 to July 8.
 On November 14, the band aired the mobile site "APOLOGIES", in which fans could see posts from Akita's blog along with other exclusive content.
 On November 28, the band released a DVD recorded during the Zepp DiverCity performance of the live tour "Gomennasai, Chanto Ieru kana" titled 0.7.
 On November 30, the band held their second one-band live at the Shibuya Public Hall. The band titled the show "Amazarashi Live 0.7". The band adopted a surround-sound system and installed a speaker outside the venue before conducting their performance.
 On December 3, Akita started his own column for the culture site Katayabu Riina, called .

2013–2014: From Nē Mama Anata no Iutōri to Yūhi Shinkō Higashizumu 
2013

 On April 10 of 2013 the band released their 5th post-debut EP, titled . The single Juvenile (ジュブナイル) from the EP was pre-sold on the iTunes Store and Recochoku.
 From May 31 to June 9, the band went on a tour titled amazarashi TOUR 2013: Nē Mama Anata no Iutōri.
 On August 16 the band participated in the "RISING SUN ROCK FESTIVAL 2013 in EZO", the first festival they've participated in since changing their name.
 On August 28 Mika Nakashima's single , composed and written by Hiromu Akita was released. Akita received the proposal from Nakashima herself, and accepted it.
 On September 30 the band performed at LIQUIDROOM ebisu, along with the frontman from Ling tosite Sigure, Toru Kitajima.
 On November 21 the band released their 6th post-debut EP, titled .

2014

 On January 6, 2014, Toyokawa Manami stopped activities due to her bad health and physical condition. Five days later, on January 6, the band began a tour, and otonamode's keyboardist, Yamamoto Kenta, acted as the support member for the band.
 On March 26, the band released a DVD containing a collection of music videos, titled anthology 1386.
 On May 23, the band announced that they would soon return to their indie name stylization, あまざらし, on September 9. Alongside this announcement, a new website was opened, containing the novel , written by Akita Hiromu and illustrated by YKBX.
 On June 7, the band participated in a second rock festival that took place in Kanazawa City of the Ishikawa Prefecture. It was titled .
 On September 9, they held an acoustic concert titled .
 On August 29, the band released their second full-length album, called .
 On November 1, the band started a live tour titled . This tour had the most installations yet, with a total of eight.

2015–2016: Sekai Shūsoku Ni Ichi Ichi Roku 
2015

 On February 18 of 2015, the band released the maxi-single . The title track was used as the ending theme song of the anime Tokyo Ghoul√A.
 On March 28, the band performed for the first time overseas at a Music Festival in Taiwan titled T-Fest 2015 Míngrì yīnyuè jì (明日音樂祭; Tomorrow's Music Festival) along with envy, TURTLE ISLAND, and MONKEY MAJIK.
 On August 13,  was released. The album consisted of studio recordings that the band had recorded using the arrangements from their previous acoustic concert. It was accompanied by the novel Starlight.
 On June 9, the band held a concert to commemorate the 5th anniversary of their debut. On the same day, the band streamed the concert live via APOLOGIES, their mobile app, to a limited number of just 400 fans. As a succession, on August 16, the band held a concert using 3D animation called "amazarashi 5th anniversary live 3D edition"
 On August 19, the band released their second maxi-single, titled . The title track was used as the opening theme for the Fuji Television original anime series, Ranpo Kitan: Game Of Laplace.
 On October 22, they were guest artists at "JFL presents LIVE FOR THE NEXT supported by ELECOM", an event supported by JAPAN FM LEAGUE, the event had other bands such as YEN TOWN BAND, flower in the basement, Lily-Chou-Chou, and other artists.
 On December 29, the band participated in COUNTDOWN JAPAN 15/16, on the GALAXY STAGE.

2016

 On January 17 of 2016, the band went on an eight-installment tour: .
 On February 9, Akita Hiromu submitted 5 poems and 1 essay to the March edition of Bungeishunju, published by Bungeishunju Ltd. "Aomori Song", one of the five poems, was made available for free on music.jp. The renowmed Sci-Fi Author,  commented on the poem saying "While it seemed like it was presenting the prefecture and city, it didn't really define it, seeming like a Machida Kou's mindset work".
 On February 24, the band released its 3rd full-length, .
 On the same day, the Mika Nakashima tribute album, MIKA NAKASHIMA TRIBUTE, performed by various artists, was released.
 On June 22, the band released the DVD of the live shows from their tour Sekai Bunki Ni Rei Ichi Roku.
 On October 12, the band released their 7th post-debut EP, titled .
 On October 15, the band held the one-band concert amazarashi LIVE 360° "Kyomubyō" at Makuhari Messe Event Hall. The concert featured a reading of Kyomubyō, the novel that came with the EP of the same title. For the concert, the band performed on a four-sided stage with large digital screens covering them from all sides so that the audience surrounded the band, hence the title "LIVE 360°".
 On December 28, the band participated in COUNTDOWN JAPAN 16/17.

2017–2018: From Message Bottle to Chihō Toshi no Memento Mori 
2017

 On February 22 of 2017, the band released their third maxi-single, which was a tie-up with the famous video-game writer, director and designer, Yoko Taro, and his game NieR:Automata. The music video of the title track was also made in collaboration with the game.
 From March 26 to October 19, the band held a live tour called "Amazarashi Live Tour Message Bottle". It was the first live tour that featured a show in the band's hometown, Aomori.
 On March 29, the band released a compilation album titled Message Bottle (written as "メッセジボトル" when necessary), which featured tie-up track , a remade version of the song , and the あまざらし-era album .
 On the same day, the band ASIAN KUNG-FU GENERATION released their 20th year commemorative tribute album, AKG TRIBUTE, in which amazarashi was featured, covering .
 On June 21, the band released a DVD of their previous concert, amazarashi LIVE 360° "Kyomubyō".
 On August 19, the band participated on SUMMER SONIC 2017, performing on Rainbow Stage.
 On September 6, the band released their 4th Maxi Single, which was featured as the 3rd opening of the shounen anime series My Hero Academia.
 On December 6 and 7, Hiromu Akita's solo concert,  was held.
 On December 13, the band released its 4th full-length album, .
 On December 28, the band performed in COUNTDOWN JAPAN 17/18.

2018

 From March 3, 2018 to April 5, 2018, amazarashi toured in 4 cities in Asia with Aimer. 
 On March 12, the digital single  was released as a collaboration with the manga .
 From April 20 to June 22, amazarashi held their Chihō Toshi no Memento Mori tour.

2020: Boycott 
2020
Boycott was released on March 11, 2020, and includes 14 songs.

Members
 — lead vocals, guitar, songwriting. He is from Yokohama, Kamikita district, in Aomori but lived in Mutsu. Since 2017, the singer lives in the city of Aomori. He started getting interested in music as he heard his older sister listening to TM NETWORK, when he was in 6th grade. Later on, he bought a keyboard and entered a cover band of THE BLUE HEARTS. His inspirations as a performer are from Mashima Masatoshi (The Cro-Magnons, ex BLUE HEARTS) and Tomokawa Kazuki, and from Shuji Terayama and Osamu Dazai as a writer. He also became a fan of artists such as Yakozen, THA BLUE HERB, RHYMESTER, Katsuyuki Kobayashi, SHINGO Nishinari and Oni. He also participated in a tribute movie to the rapper 不可思議/wonderboy (Fukashigi/wonderboy) called living behavior.
 — keyboard, backing vocals

Support members 

 — guitar, programming, arrangements
 — percussion
 — bass guitar
 — keyboard during the period Manami had bad physical condition

Amazarashi Senbun no Ichiya Monogatari Sutāraito support members 

 Koshikawa Masayuki — bass guitar
 Kimura Masayuki — bass guitar
 Murata Yasuko — viola
 Suhara Anzu — violin
 Suma Wasei — violin
 Yano Sayuri — violin

Discography

Studio albums

Mini albums

a: In the traditional Japanese calendar, Reiwa 2 corresponds to the year A.D. 2020.

Compilation albums

Singles

Video works

Music videos

Songs appearances

Awards and nominations

References

External links
 
 

Musical groups established in 2007
2007 establishments in Japan
Japanese alternative rock groups
Indie folk groups
Sony Music Entertainment Japan artists
Japanese rock music groups